Cañada del Provencio is a village in the municipality of Molinicos, province of Albacete, in the autonomous community of Castile-La Mancha, Spain. 

Populated places in the Province of Albacete